Zumpe is a surname. Notable people with the surname include:

  (born 1929), German university professor
 Johannes Zumpe (1726–1790), Anglo-German piano maker
 Hermann Zumpe (1850–1903), German conductor and composer

German-language surnames